Strait-Jacket is a 1964 American psychological thriller film directed and produced by William Castle, written by Robert Bloch and starring Joan Crawford. Its plot follows a woman who, having murdered her husband and his lover decades prior, is suspected of a series of axe murders following her release from a psychiatric hospital.

Released by Columbia Pictures in January 1964, the film was the first of two written for Castle by Robert Bloch, the second being The Night Walker (1964). The film's plot makes use of the psychological abuse method known as gaslighting.

Plot
Lucy Harbin has a solution for adultery - 40 whacks with an axe. That's what happens when she finds her husband in bed with his lover. So it's off with their heads. Unfortunately, Lucy's three-year-old daughter, Carol, witnesses the deed. Lucy is tried and judged criminally insane. She spends the next 20 years at an institution. That's how long it takes for her to be found mentally stable. Upon her release, Lucy decides to live with her brother and his wife on their farm. There, she is reunited with daughter Carol, who is now an artist and sculptor. She also goes steady with the richest young man in town. His name is Michael. 

Carol attempts to create a bond with her mother. Mom, however, is troubled by dreams and flashbacks of her horrific act. She envisions lying in bed with the severed heads of her two victims. One day, she is visted at the farm by Dr. Anderson, her psychiatrist back at the asylum. The encounter proves too much for Lucy. She experiences an emotional breakdown. Her doctor now questions the institute's decision to release her into society. Shortly after though, the doctor's body is found dismembered in the barn. Lucy fears she may have chopped up the doc during one of her traumatic visions. Daughter Carol attempts to hide the doctor's car but is blackmailed by the farm's meddling handyman. A short time later, he is found decapitated.

One evening, Lucy and Carol visit Michael's parents for dinner. It is not a happy affair. Michael's mother believes Carol is unfit to marry her boy and says so. In a rage, Lucy storms out of the house, pursued by Carol and Michael, leaving Michael's parents alone in their home. Later, while in his closet, Michael's father is butchered. Michael's mom is subsequently confronted by the killer, who is wearing a latex mask that resembles Lucy's face. Then, Lucy herself enters, having returned to the house. Lucy fights and subdues the killer. She removes the mask, revealing the murderer. It turns out to be Carol. She admits to the killings, having been motivated by greed. Carol had hoped to murder Michael's parents and frame Lucy, enabling her to marry Michael. In the film's ironic finale, Lucy goes to visit Carol in the same psychiatric hospital where she was once confined.

Cast
 Joan Crawford as Lucy Harbin
 Diane Baker as Carol Cutler
 Leif Erickson as Bill Cutler
 Howard St. John as Raymond Fields
 John Anthony Hayes as  Michael Fields
 Rochelle Hudson as Emily Cutler
 George Kennedy as Leo Krause
 Edith Atwater as Mrs. Allison Fields
 Mitchell Cox as Dr. Anderson
Strait-Jacket featured the first big-screen appearance of Lee Majors in the uncredited role of Frank Harbin, Lucy Harbin's husband.

Production

Development
After the success of What Ever Happened to Baby Jane? (1962), Joan Crawford and other older actresses, including Bette Davis and Barbara Stanwyck, appeared in many horror movies throughout the 1960s. Strait-Jacket is one of the examples of the genre sometimes referred to as psycho-biddy, hagsploitation or Grande Dame Guignol.

Casting
Crawford replaced Joan Blondell in the role of Lucy Harbin after Blondell was injured at home prior to shooting and could not fulfill her commitment. Crawford's negotiations included script and cast approval, a $50,000 salary, and 15 percent of the profits. Anne Helm, who was originally cast in the role as Carol, was replaced by Diane Baker, reportedly at Crawford's insistence. Baker and Crawford had appeared together in the film The Best of Everything (1959). Baker asserted that the original actress for her part, Anne Helm, had numerous problems with Crawford. According to Baker, Crawford said, "it wasn't working out, her timing was off, she wasn't getting it, she wasn't seeing eye-to-eye, or she wasn't working the way Crawford wanted to work" on the 'making-of' featurette on the DVD of the film.

Promotion
During the film's original release, moviegoers were given little cardboard axes as they entered the theater. At the end of the closing credits, the Columbia logo's torch-bearing woman is shown in her traditional pose, but decapitated, with her head resting at her feet on her pedestal.

Reception

The film received mixed reviews from critics, while most praised Crawford's performance; the general critical consensus being that she was better than the material. Variety noted, "Miss Crawford does well by her role, delivering an animated performance." Judith Crist commented in the New York Herald Tribune that "it's time to get Joan Crawford out of those housedress horror B movies and back into haute couture...this madness-and-murder tale...might have been a thriller, given Class A treatment." Elaine Rothschild in Films in Review wrote: "I am full of admiration for Joan Crawford, for even in drek like this she gives a performance."

Bosley Crowther, however, wrote a scathing review of both the film and Crawford's performance in The New York Times, declaring: "Joan Crawford has picked some lemons, some very sour lemons, in her day, but nigh the worst of the lot is "Strait-Jacket". He goes on to call the film a "disgusting piece of claptrap." Richard L. Coe of The Washington Post also hated the film, calling it "likely to stand as the worst picture of the year ... Apart from the absurdity of the plot and the chilling predictability of lines and situations, 'Strait-Jacket' is inexcusable for its scenes of violence."

The film is listed in Golden Raspberry Award founder John Wilson's book The Official Razzie Movie Guide as one of The 100 Most Enjoyably Bad Movies Ever Made. The film also maintains an 88% rating on review aggregation website Rotten Tomatoes, based on 8 reviews.

Assisted by Castle's promotion gimmicks, including in-person appearances by Crawford, the film was a big hit, making in 2019 adjusted grosses $60.8 million at the American box office.

Home media
Strait-Jacket was released on Region 1 DVD on March 12, 2002. On February 4, 2014, it was re-released on Region 1 DVD as part of the Sony Pictures Choice Collection online program.

Shout! Factory released the film on Blu-ray on August 21, 2018. Mill Creek Entertainment also released the film along with Berserk! on a double feature Blu-ray on October 2, 2018.

Legacy
An excerpt from the film is seen on TV in the 1994 John Waters film Serial Mom.

The promotion of Strait-Jacket by the studio, the director and Crawford is addressed in the episode "Hagsploitation" of the 2017 television miniseries Feud.

See also
List of American films of 1964

References

External links

Review of Strait-Jacket at TVGuide.com

1964 films
1964 horror films
1960s psychological thriller films
American black-and-white films
American horror thriller films
Columbia Pictures films
Films shot in California
Films directed by William Castle
Films with screenplays by Robert Bloch
Psycho-biddy films
1960s English-language films
1960s American films